NGC 904 is an elliptical galaxy in the constellation Aries. It is estimated to be 244 million light years from the Milky Way and has a diameter of approximately 85,000 ly. NGC 904 was discovered on 13 December 1884 by the astronomer Edouard Stephan.

See also 
 List of NGC objects (1–1000)

References

External links 
 

Elliptical galaxies
Aries (constellation)
0904
009112